Fort Defiance (Brooklyn) was one of the forts constructed by General Nathanael Greene in 1776 to provide for the defense of New York.

Construction

On August 27, 1776, during the Battle of Long Island, five cannons, a series of earthworks and a defensive wall were manned by colonials on an island in New York Bay. It was the westernmost of forts along Brooklyn Heights, defending the Upper New York Bay from incursion by the British navy. Prior to the battle a thousand men worked under General Israel Putnam's direction to prepare for the invasion of New York, building the fort during one night in April. General George Washington inspected the fort in May, finding it 'exceedingly strong'. The complex consisted of three redoubts on the small island, connected by trenches, with an earthwork on the island's south side to defend against a landing. The cannons at Fort Defiance fired, as did the cannons at Governor's Island and at Fort George. The ships survived, bombarded the city and went on to blockade the crossings at Tarrytown, N.Y.

H.M.S. Roebuck
Early on the morning of the battle the British fleet, anchored off Staten Island, proceeded up the harbor and encountered stiff north-easterly winds. All were forced to turn back, except for H.M.S. Roebuck. Stalled at Buttermilk Channel, it came under fire from Fort Defiance, and returned same. By midmorning the Carronade from Roebuck had silenced the redoubts, but she had been damaged and retired to anchorage.

Aftermath
The fort was abandoned after the war, the embankments leveled, the dredges filled in the ponds and the Atlantic Basin was hollowed out to be made into a protected wharf. The Indian path to the fort was named the Red Hook Road from the fort to Fulton St. By the 1850s, it was becoming the largest port in NYC. Valentino Park has a plaque commemorating Fort Defiance (a stop on the Revolutionary War Heritage Trail) about 2 blocks from its actual location at Conover and Van Dyke Streets. In the 1950s a plaque was placed in a wall at Todd Shipyards Corporation on the corner of Dwight and Beard streets. The bronze plaque was installed by the historian of Brooklyn; it is now lost.

References

External links

Military installations established in 1776
American Revolutionary War forts
1776 establishments in New York (state)
Long Island
Long Island
Military history of New York City
18th century in Brooklyn
 
Red Hook, Brooklyn